Harpalus anxioides is a species of ground beetle in the subfamily Harpalinae. It was described by Kataev in 1991.

References

anxioides
Beetles described in 1991